Osuitok Ipeelee  (23 September 1923 Neeouleeutalik camp-2005 Cape Dorset) was an Inuk sculptor who lived in Cape Dorset, Nunavut. His sculptures in green soapstone of caribou and birds are particularly valued for their balance and delicacy. He was an early collaborator with James Archibald Houston, and by Houston's account was instrumental in the conception of the West Baffin Island Eskimo Cooperative. He was also one of the witnesses of the last-remembered traditional Inuit trial.

Biography

Youth and early work
Ipeelee grew up in a traditional Inuit environment, learning to hunt and fish from his father, Ohotok Ipeelee, at a small camp near Cape Dorset. Ohotok also taught his son how to carve ivory, and as early as the age of thirteen Osuitok began to sculpt. This was encouraged by Roman Catholic missionaries, who bought carvings and commissioned small crucifixes from him. The artist's earliest extant works are ivory miniatures of hunting equipment, typical of the historic period of Inuit art, that date from the 1940s.

James Houston and subsequent career
Before Houston's 1951 expedition, Ipeelee was already regionally known as the greatest carver on Baffin Island. Under Houston's influence he began to carve sculptures in soapstone, which had a reliable market in the south. Exhibits of Inuit art at the National Gallery of Canada in 1952 and 1955 included his work, crediting him as "Oshaweetuk B".  With recognition he began to receive official commissions. In 1955 he directed a team of craftsmen in the creation of the official mace for the Council of the Northwest Territories, and in 1959 he was asked to create a sculpture of Queen Elizabeth II, which was presented to the Queen upon her visit to Canada that year.

The birth of Inuit printmaking
The idea of a Cape Dorset printmaking program developed from a winter 1957 conversation between Houston and Ipeelee.
As Houston recalled:

Osuitok Ipeelee sat near me one evening studying the sailor-head trademarks on a number of identical cigarette packages. He...stated that it must have been very tiresome...to sit painting every one of the small heads on the small packages with the exact sameness...

My explanation was far from successful...partly because I was starting to wonder whether this could have any practical application in Inuit terms.

Looking around to find some way to demonstrate printing, I saw an ivory walrus tusk that Osuitok had recently engraved...

Taking an old tin of writing ink... with my finger I dipped into the black residue and smoothed it over the tusk. I laid a piece of toilet paper on the inked surface and rubbed the top lightly, then quickly stripped the paper from the tusk. I saw that by mere good fortune, I had pulled a fairly good negative of Osuitok's incised design.

"We could do that," he said, with the instant decisiveness of a hunter. And so we did.
Despite this, Ipeelee only contributed a total of four prints to the annual print collections, two in 1958 and two in 1959. He never returned to the medium explaining that he had not been paid enough for the drawings on which the prints were based, and found sculpture to be more profitable.

Works

Notable sculptures
Harpoon Head Figure (1983), serpentine. In the collection of the National Gallery of Canada.

Prints
Musk Ox, 1958. Stonecut
Weasel, 1958. Stonecut
Four Musk Oxen, 1959. Stonecut and sealskin stencil
Owl, Fox, and Hare Legend, 1959. Stonecut and  sealskin stencil

Honors
National Aboriginal Achievement Award, now the Indspire Awards, recipient, 2004.
 Elected a member of the Royal Canadian Academy of Arts, 1973.

Footnotes

References

External links
 Biographical entry at the Canadian Encyclopedia
 Image gallery from the National Gallery of Canada.
 Entry on the Union List of Artist Names

1923 births
2005 deaths
Inuit sculptors
Members of the Royal Canadian Academy of Arts
Artists from Nunavut
People from Kinngait
Inuit from the Northwest Territories
20th-century Canadian sculptors
Indspire Awards
Inuit from Nunavut